Statistics of the Mongolia Premier League for the 2008 season.

Overview
Erchim won the championship.

League standings

Playoff

Semifinals
Khoromkhon 2-2 (pen 4-3) Khasiin Khulguud
Erchim 5-1 Selenge Press

Third Place
Khasiin Khulguud 3-3 (pen 5-4) Selenge Press

Final
Erchim 3-1 Khoromkhon

References
RSSSF

Mongolia Premier League seasons
Mongolia
Mongolia
football